NGC 114 is a barred lenticular galaxy located in the constellation Cetus. It was discovered by American astronomer Truman Henry Safford on September 23, 1867. The galaxy lies approximately 195 million light-years from Earth, and is about 55,000 light-years in diameter, nearly half the size of the Milky Way.

References

External links
 
 

0114
NGC 0114
NGC 0114
001660
0259
Astronomical objects discovered in 1867
Discoveries by Truman Safford